Glutamicibacter is a genus of bacteria from the family of Micrococcaceae.

References

Micrococcaceae
Bacteria genera